Balvaneh may refer to:
 Balvaneh-ye Khaledi
 Balvaneh-ye Motamedi